{{DISPLAYTITLE:C2HCl2F3}}
The molecular formula C2HCl2F3 (molar mass: 152.93 g/mol, exact mass: 151.9407 u) may refer to:

 2,2-Dichloro-1,1,1-trifluoroethane
 1,2-Dichloro-1,1,2-trifluoroethane